Human intelligence (abbreviated HUMINT and pronounced as hyoo-mint) is intelligence gathered by means of interpersonal contact, as opposed to the more technical intelligence gathering disciplines such as signals intelligence (SIGINT), imagery intelligence (IMINT) and measurement and signature intelligence (MASINT).

NATO defines HUMINT as "a category of intelligence derived from information collected and provided by human sources."  HUMINT, as the name suggests, is mostly done by people rather than any technical means, and is commonly provided by covert agents and spies. For instance, Oleg Penkovsky was a Soviet military intelligence (GRU) colonel who served as a source to the UK and the United States by informing them of the precise knowledge necessary to address rapidly developing military tensions with the Soviet Union. A typical HUMINT activity consists of interrogations and conversations with persons having access to information. 

The manner in which HUMINT operations are conducted is dictated by both official protocol and the nature of the source of the information. Within the context of the U.S. military, HUMINT activity may involve clandestine activities, however these operations are more closely associated with CIA projects. Both counterintelligence and HUMINT include clandestine HUMINT and clandestine HUMINT operational techniques.

See also

 97E, (ninety seven echo) the Military Occupational Specialty code designating a human intelligence collector in the US Army
Document Exploitation
 Intelligence collection management

References

Intelligence gathering disciplines